Otto Benjamin Andreas Aubert (1841–1898) was a Norwegian civil servant and politician.  He was the son of the Norwegian politician Michael Conrad Sophus Emil Aubert.  

He served as the County Governor of Nordland county from 1878 until 1889.  In 1889, he was appointed to serve as the County Governor of Bratsberg county until his death in 1898.  

Aubert died in a horse accident when a running horse rushed towards him on a slippery sidewalk, causing him to fall backwards and damage his brain.

References

1841 births
1898 deaths
County governors of Norway
County governors of Nordland